Coptomma is a genus of beetles belonging to the family Cerambycidae.

The species of this genus are found in New Zealand.

Species:

 Coptomma douei 
 Coptomma lineatum 
 Coptomma marrisi 
 Coptomma sticticum 
 Coptomma sulcatum 
 Coptomma variegatum

References 

Cerambycidae